black ice were a synchronized skating team from Canada. Their senior team were three-time medalists at the World Championships and eight-time Canadian national champions. The team was founded by Cathy Dalton and Susan Pettes. On October 20, 2010, black ice announced they were retiring. Their junior team won the 2006 French Cup and was 5th at Junior World Challenge Cup that same year. black ice also appeared on the Canadian reality show Say Yes & Marry Me! in 2003, where they helped a man propose to his girlfriend.

Competitive results

References

Senior synchronized skating teams
Figure skating in Canada
World Synchronized Skating Championships medalists